Amunet or Imnt (The Hidden One in hieroglyphics); also spelled Amonet or Amaunet) is a primordial goddess in ancient Egyptian religion. Thebes was the center of her worship through the last dynasty, the Ptolemaic Kingdom, in 30 BC. She is attested in the earliest known of Egyptian religious texts and, as was the custom, was paired with a counterpart who is entitled with the same name, but in the masculine, Amun. They were thought to have existed prior to the beginning of creation along with three other couples representing primeval concepts.

Description and history

Primeval counterparts 
Her name, is a feminine noun that means "The Hidden One". She is a member of the Ogdoad of Hermopolis, who represented aspects of the primeval existence before the creation: Amunet was paired with Amun—whose name also means "The Hidden One", with a masculine ending (jmn)—within this divine group, from the earliest known documentation. Such pairing of deities is characteristic of the religious concepts of the ancient Egyptians. In early concepts known as the Ogdoad, the primeval deity group to which they belonged as "Night" (or as the determinative D41 meaning "to halt, stop, deny", suggesting the principle of inactivity or repose),<ref>Budge, Wallis A., [https://archive.org/stream/godsofegyptianso00budg The Gods of the Egyptians: Or, Studies in Egyptian Mythology], 1904, volume 1</ref> was composed of four balanced couples of deities or deified primeval concepts. 

Speculation exists that Amunet may have been conceived by later theologians as a complement to Amun, rather than being an independent deity originally, however, the Pyramid Texts, the earliest known religious texts of Ancient Egypt, mention "the beneficent shadow of Amun and Amunet": 

 Cult becomes localized 
By at least the Twelfth Dynasty of Egypt (c. 1991–1803 BC), Amunet often was superseded by Mut as Amun's partner, as cults evolved or similar ones in other regions were merged following Mentuhotep II's reunification of Egypt—but Amunet remained locally important in Thebes, where Amun was worshipped. In that capitol of the unified country she was seen as a protector of the king, playing a preeminent role in rituals associated with the royal coronation (khaj-nisut) and Sed festivals (heb-sed'') celebrating its well-celebrated anniversaries, and priests were dedicated to Amunet's service at Karnak, Amun's cult center. 

In the Festival Hall of Thutmose III (c. 1479–1425 BC), Amunet is shown with the fertility god Min while leading a row of deities to visit the king in the anniversary celebration. In spite of Amunet's stable position as a local goddess of Egypt's most important city, her cult began to have very little following outside the Theban region that developed into a dominant religious center for the unified country.

Amunet was depicted as a woman wearing the Deshret "Red Crown of Lower Egypt" and carrying a staff of papyrus—as in her colossal statue placed during the reign of Tutankhamun (c. 1332–1323 BC) into the Record Hall of Thutmose III at Karnak. The reason for this iconography is uncertain. At that time, the cult of Amun was being restored after being displaced by worship of Aten during the reign of Akhenaten.

Although she remained a distinct deity as late as the Ptolemaic Kingdom (323–30 BC), in some late texts from Karnak Amunet was syncretized with Neith and she was carved suckling pharaoh Philip III of Macedon (323–317 BC) who appears as a divine child immediately after his own enthronement, onto an exterior wall of the eighteenth dynasty Festival Hall of Thutmose III at Karnak.

Gallery

References

Bibliography 

Amun
Egyptian goddesses